Malenski Vrh is a small settlement in the Municipality of Gorenja Vas–Poljane in the Upper Carniola region of Slovenia. It lies in the hills north of Poljane.

Name
The name Malenski Vrh literally means 'Mill Peak'. It is derived from maln 'mill'.

References

External links 

Malenski Vrh on Geopedia

Populated places in the Municipality of Gorenja vas-Poljane